Badamassi Saguirou (born 28 November 2001) is an Nigerien track and field athlete and a national record holder in men's 110 hurdles.

Career 
He made his Olympic debut representing Niger at the 2020 Summer Olympics and competed in the  men's 100m event. He received universality place to compete at the 2020 Summer Olympics. He ran a personal best time of 10.87 seconds.

References

External links 
 

2001 births
Living people
Nigerien male sprinters
Athletes (track and field) at the 2020 Summer Olympics
Olympic male sprinters
Olympic athletes of Niger